Richard Kay (1937–1987) was a British actor. Originally from Newcastle-upon-Tyne, he was educated at Leighton Park School followed by Emmanuel College, Cambridge and is best known for his work in Déjà Vu (1985), Three Sisters (1970) and Wuthering Heights (1978). In television, he appeared in Coronation Street and Juliet Bravo amongst other programmes. 

Kay was married to Jacqueline Venetia Maxwell (married 1964). Their son is the actor Barnaby Kay.

References

1937 births
1987 deaths
Male actors from Newcastle upon Tyne
20th-century British male actors
British male soap opera actors
British male film actors
Alumni of Emmanuel College, Cambridge